Pedro Santos may refer to:

Pedro Santos (judoka) (born 1955), Puerto Rican judoka
Pedro Santos (politician), Peruvian
Pedro Abad Santos (1876–1945), Filipino politician
Pedro Paulo Santos (born 1935), archbishop of the Roman Catholic Archdiocese of Caceres
Pedro Santos (footballer, born 1976), Portuguese football midfielder
Pedro Santos (footballer, born 1977), Brazilian football midfielder
Pedro Santos (footballer, born 1983), Portuguese football defender
Pedro Santos (footballer, born 1988), Portuguese football winger
Pedro Santos (footballer, born 1993), Spanish football midfielder
Pedro Santos (footballer, born 1996), Portuguese football defender
Pedro Santos (footballer, born 1997), Brazilian football midfielder
Pedro Santos (footballer, born 1999), Mexican-American football midfielder
Pedro Santos (footballer, born 2000), Portuguese football forward
Pedro Santos (footballer, born 2003), Portuguese football midfielder
Pedro Santos (football manager) (born 1980), Portuguese